A by-election was held for the New South Wales Legislative Assembly electorate of Murray on 2 February 1985. The election was triggered by the resignation of  National party member, Tim Fischer to successfully contest the seat of Farrer at the 1984 federal election.

The Murray by-election was held the same day as the Peats by-election.

Dates

Results

National party member Tim Fischer resigned to successfully contest the seat of Farrer at the 1984 federal election.

See also
Electoral results for the district of Murray
List of New South Wales state by-elections

References 

1985 elections in Australia
New South Wales state by-elections
1980s in New South Wales